Rennick Névé is the névé at the head of Rennick Glacier in Victoria Land. Named by the New Zealand Antarctic Place-Names Committee (NZ-APC) in about 1966 in association with Rennick Glacier.
 

Snow fields of Victoria Land
Pennell Coast
Névés of Antarctica